Karl Friedrich Stäudlin (July 25, 1761 – July 5, 1826) was a German Protestant theologian born in Stuttgart.

He studied theology in Tübingen, and from 1790 was a professor of theology at the University of Göttingen, where remained for nearly 36 years. In 1803 he was appointed Consistorialrath.

He was an advocate of "rational Supranaturalism". His writings largely dealt with church history, moral theology and moral philosophy. On the latter subject, he was profoundly influenced by the work of Immanuel Kant.

Selected publications 
 Geschichte und Geist des Skeptizismus (History and spirit of skepticism), 1794.
 Kirchliche Geographie und Statistik (Religious history and statistics), 1804.
 Geschichte der philosophie und biblischen Moral (History of philosophy and Biblical morals), 1805.
 Geschichte der christlichen Moral (History of Christian morals), 1808.
 Geschichte der theologischen Wissenschaften (History of theological science), 1810–11.
 Geschichte des Rationalismus und Supernaturalismus (History of rationalism and supranaturalism), 1826.

References 
 John C. Laursen, “Skepticism and the History of Moral Philosophy: The Case of Carl Friedrich Stäudlin”, in John van der Zande and Richard Popkin (eds.), The Sceptical Tradition around 1800: Scepticism in Philosophy, Science, and Society, Dordrecht, Kluwer, 1998.
 IDREF.fr Bibliography of Karl Friedrich Stäudlin

19th-century German Protestant theologians
Academic staff of the University of Göttingen
1761 births
1826 deaths
Writers from Stuttgart
German historians of religion
German male non-fiction writers
19th-century male writers